Gülnar is a district of the Mersin Province in Turkey.

Gülnar or Gulnar may also refer to:

 Gülnar Hatun (731–769), Turkish female hero
 Gülnar Haýytbaýewa, Turkmenistani judoka in the 2012 Summer Olympics